Hansjörg Lunger (born 4 September 1964) is an Italian ski mountaineer.

Lunger was born  in Karneid. He started ski mountaineering in 1985, competed first in 2003 and was member of the national team after 2006. Lunger is dairyman of the Schutzhaus Latzfonser Kreuz, a mountain hut in the Sarntal Alps. His daughter Tamara is also a competition ski mountaineer.

Selected results 
 2004:
 8th (and 1st in "seniors II" class ranking), Patrouille des Glaciers (together with Oswald Santin and Manfred Dorfmann)
 2005:
 1st, Sellaronda Skimarathon (together with Alberto Gerardini)
 2006:
 1st, World Championship relay race (together with Manfred Reichegger, Dennis Brunod and Guido Giacomelli)
 1st, Adamello Ski Raid (together with Guido Giacomelli and Mirco Mezzanotte)
 2nd, "Fitschi Dachstein Xtreme" race
 5th, World Championship team race (together with Guido Giacomelli)
 2007:
 1st and course record, Sellaronda Skimarathon (together with Guido Giacomelli)
 2nd, Mountain Attack race
 3rd, Traça Catalana race
 2008:
 1st and course record, Sellaronda Skimarathon (together with Guido Giacomelli)
 2nd, World Championship team race (together with Guido Giacomelli)
 2nd, Mountain Attack race
 9th, World Cup race, Val d'Aran
 2010:
 1st, Sellaronda Skimarathon (together with Guido Giacomelli)

Pierra Menta 

 2006: 2nd, together with Guido Giacomelli
 2007: 2nd, together with Guido Giacomelli
 2008: 2nd, together with Guido Giacomelli

Trofeo Mezzalama 

 2005: 4th, together with Alexander Lugger and Olivier Nägele
 2007: 3rd, together with Dennis Brunod and Manfred Reichegger

External links 
 Hansjörg Lunger at skimountaineering.org

References 

1964 births
Living people
People from Karneid
Italian male ski mountaineers
World ski mountaineering champions
Sportspeople from Südtirol